Wang Qiang was the defending champion, but chose not to participate.

Nao Hibino won the title, defeating Eri Hozumi in an all-Japanese final, 6–3, 6–1.

Seeds

Main draw

Finals

Top half

Bottom half

References 
 Main draw

Kurume Best Amenity Cup - Singles
Kurume Best Amenity Cup